Giesbrecht is the surname of the following people

Gordon Giesbrecht, Canadian psychologist
Helmut Giesbrecht (1943-2020), Canadian politician in British Columbia
Mark Giesbrecht, Canadian computer scientist
Wilhelm Giesbrecht (1854-1913), Prussian zoologist

Russian Mennonite surnames